Keratin 14 is a member of the type I keratin family of intermediate filament proteins. Keratin 14 was the first type I keratin sequence determined.
Keratin 14 is also known as cytokeratin-14 (CK-14) or keratin-14 (KRT14). In humans it is encoded by the KRT14 gene.

Keratin 14 is usually found as a heterodimer with type II keratin 5 and form the cytoskeleton of epithelial cells.

Pathology
Mutations in the genes for these keratins are associated with epidermolysis bullosa simplex and dermatopathia pigmentosa reticularis, both of which are autosomal dominant mutations.

See also 
34βE12 (keratin 903)

References

Further reading

External links 
  GeneReviews/NCBI/UW/NIH entry on Epidermolysis Bullosa Simplex
 Proteopedia page on keratins

Keratins